Seán O'Leary's GAC Newbridge is a Gaelic Athletic Association club based in Newbridge, County Londonderry, Northern Ireland. The club is a member of Derry GAA and currently caters for Gaelic football and camogie. Newbridge has won the Derry Senior Football Championship on ten occasions.

Teams up to Under-12s play in South Derry league and championships, and those from U-14 upwards compete in All-Derry competitions.

2019 Championship Football

2018 Championship Football

2017 Championship Football

History
Gaelic games had been played on the western shores of Lough Neagh for decades before the founding of the club. Seán O'Leary's GAC Newbridge was established in 1925 and covered the Newbridge and Ballymaguigan areas, both in Ardtrea North parish. The American Army built Toome airfield during World War II. This effectively split the parish in two, making it very difficult for the Ballymaguigan-based players to travel to the pitch and a separate club, St Trea's GFC, was set up in Ballymaguigan in 1944.

Gaelic football
Newbridge first won the Derry Senior Football Championship in 1937 and added further Senior Championship successes in 1940, 1945 and 1948. Success carried into the 1950s and the club won the Championship again in 1950 and 1955. With the emergence of the extremely successful Bellaghy side of the late 1950s and early 1960s, it was 1966 before Newbridge added another Senior Championship, and won the competition again in 1967 and 1970.

O'Leary's won their most recent Senior Championship in 1989 and thereafter slipped down to Intermediate level. They won the Derry Intermediate Football Championship in 2002 and most recently in 2007. The club won Division 2 of the All-County League in 2008, and returned to competing at Senior level in 2009.

Newbridge fields Gaelic football teams at U8, U10, U12, U14, U16, Minor, Reserve and Senior levels. In addition to winning the Derry Senior Championship ten times, the club has won the Derry Intermediate Football Championship twice. They currently compete in the Derry Senior Championship and Division 1 of the Derry ACFL.

Honours
 Derry Senior Football Championship (10)
 1937, 1940 1945 1948 1950 1955 1966 1967 1970 1989
 Derry Senior Reserve Football Championship (2)
 1987,1988
 Derry Intermediate Reserve Football Championship (1)
 1999
 Dean Mcglinchey Cups (12)
 1939, 1940, 1942, 1943, 1944, 1945, 1946, 1947, 1948, 1949, 1950, 1956
Note: The above lists may be incomplete. Please add any other senior-team honours you know of.

Notable players
Damian Barton - member of Derry's 1993 All-Ireland winning team
Henry Diamond
Tommy Doherty - former Derry player and team selector 1989 Derry Championship
Hugh Francis Gribben
Owen Gribben
Roddy Gribben - former Derry player and manager
Patsy McLarnon - former Derry player
John Murphy - won National Football League with Derry in 1947

Camogie
The club also has camogie teams across various ages.

Website
The club launched its website in June 2009 with the aim of keeping the local community and exiles up-to-date with the activities around the club.

See also
List of Gaelic games clubs in Derry

External links
Newbridge GAC website

References

Gaelic games clubs in County Londonderry
Gaelic football clubs in County Londonderry
1925 establishments in Northern Ireland